BitlBee is a cross-platform IRC instant messaging gateway, licensed under the terms of the GNU General Public License.

BitlBee communicates with the user via the IRC protocol, providing a gateway to popular chat networks such as AIM and ICQ (via OSCAR), Microsoft Messenger service (via MSNP), Yahoo! (via YMSG) and Facebook Messenger (via MQTT with a plugin) and the microblogging networks Twitter, Identi.ca, and GNU Social.  Since version 3.0, BitlBee can be built to use the libpurple library, which supports file transfers on many IM networks, and supports GaduGadu, QQ and other less well-known protocols. Off-the-record messaging is supported by Bitlbee. It supports the display of remote user status using the IRC voice attribute: online users are shown with voice, away users are shown without. Many IRC commands such as /WHO and /QUERY are available, though the capabilities of the remote IM protocols limit which IRC commands will work.

It can be installed and operated on a user's personal computer, a local server, or accessed on public gateway servers. A user registers with the BitlBee server for future credentials storage.  Service protocols are added along with their credentials; following this, the software will display the user's buddy list as normal IRC users in a channel. Conversations can be public, or use the private message facility of IRC.

BitlBee runs on Linux, Unix, BSD, Windows, AmigaOS and Mac OS X.

The software has been reviewed positively. Vladi Belperchinov-Shabanski wrote that the software made his "dream come true", of only needing a single chat client open on his desktop, to access multiple IM protocols.

See also

 Comparison of instant messaging clients

References

External links
 BitlBee homepage

2002 software
Instant messaging clients for Linux
MacOS instant messaging clients
Windows instant messaging clients
Free instant messaging clients
Free XMPP clients
Internet Relay Chat bouncers, gateways and proxies
Yahoo! instant messaging clients
Free communication software